Hippeastrum elegans is a species of flowering plant. It is native to Central and South America, from Costa Rica to Brazil.

See also 
 List of Hippeastrum species

References

External links 

 Hippeastrum elegans at The Plant List

elegans
Flora of South America
Plants described in 1963